George Eugene Franklin (born July 5, 1954) is a former professional American football running back in the National Football League. He played for the Atlanta Falcons in 1978.

External links
Pro-Football reference

1954 births
Living people
Atlanta Falcons players
Texas A&M–Kingsville Javelinas football players
People from Seguin, Texas
New York Giants players